Erigeron anchana, the Sierra Ancha fleabane,  is a rare Arizona species of flowering plant in the family Asteraceae. It has been found only on cliff faces and in rocky areas in central Arizona. The name "anchana" refers to a mountain range called Sierra Ancha in Gila County, Arizona.

Erigeron anchana is a short perennial rarely more than 22 cm (9 inches) tall. The inflorescence generally consists of 1 - 3 flower heads, each head with a ring of 14–36 white ray florets surrounding a disc of yellow disc florets.

References

anchana
Flora of Arizona
Plants described in 1990